Viktor Palokaj (born March 18, 1981), known professionally as Unikkatil (stylized as UniKKatil), is an Albanian rapper, singer, songwriter and record producer 
who lives in Bronx, New York City. He was born in Prishtina, Kosovo. He was one of the first Albanian rappers and the leader of TBA (The Bloody Alboz). The message that he sends throughout   his songs and the fact that he never made a music video during his career make his style of rap unique. Although he isn’t as active in the music industry recently, he's still considered by many the best Albanian rapper of all time.

Early life 

Viktor Palokaj known as Unikkatil was born on March 18, 1981, and he stared his carrier 12 years later with the songs "Zinxhirt qe s'kputen". Over time with the problems on Kosovo with Serbs Viktor was always different from others, from his songs, "Radio Selavija" (the only radio at the time) was scare to listen to his songs because of the way he was insulting the Serbia. Otherwise Viktor finished the middle school on Pristina, and at the same time he was member of the Karate Club named "Studenti". And then he registered in the city Sami Frashëri High School when he went through

different problems and as a result he was expelled from school 3 times and for this he shows more on his songs "Ni Milion Rrugë".

A Personal Problem with an other family on 1996 it was the reason why Viktor immigrated to United States that he was placed in New York City accurately on The Bronx.

After moving in USA Viktor opened his own Studio called "CONQUEROR RECORDS"  Where from 1998 to 2000 he did Songs only in English, which from the songs "Bloody Alboz" that Viktor did with his Friend 'MILOT' he came up with the idea of the Band "THE BLOODY ALBOZ" which in Albania it means "Shqipet e Përgjakshme".

The first members that joined on the group were: Unikkatil, Milot, Presion, ZEF, Klepto, Cyanide, Jeton, NAG and B52 which he died on April of 2018!

Unikkatil posted his first album on 2002 called "Shihemi N'përkujtime", then on 2004 he posted "Fjalët E Pavdekshme",  on 2005 Unikkatil present "The Bloody Alboz", "Armiqt Suprem" which 3 days after it lunch's he sold about '8000' Copies and after one year he posed his last album till now "Kanuni Katilit".

Also Unikkatil Knows for a Record That he did on 15 July of 2012 for collecting about 28,000 people in his concert at Pristina stadium.

Other ways Unikkatil is considered the GoAT of the ALBANIAN HipHop/Rap!

Discography 
 Unikkatil - Je ngule (feat. Don Phenom)
 Unikkatil - Eci po eci
 Unikkatil - A Nive (Feat. Klepto)
 Unikkatil - A Nive (Remix) (Feat. Klepto)
 Unikkatil - Andrra Jem
 Unikkatil - Armiqt Suprem (intro)
 Unikkatil - Arsyetimi Jem
 Unikkatil - Beat
 Unikkatil - Belagji Linda Belagji Vdes
 Unikkatil - Besnik I Rruges (Feat. Immortel & 2po2)
 Unikkatil - Bloody Bloody Alboz
 Unikkatil - Buja Diss
 Unikkatil - Caku I Arritur
 Unikkatil - Causing Trauma
 Unikkatil - Change (Feat. Milot)
 Unikkatil - Courage
 Unikkatil - Crazy Albanian
 Unikkatil - Cubat (Feat. Bloody Alboz, Presioni, V.E.B)
 Unikkatil - Dallash Qargash (Me Fjal Te Rana Si Balena)
 Unikkatil - Demo 2011
 Unikkatil - Demtus (Feat. Presioni & Vz)
 Unikkatil - Dikush (Inat Inat) (Feat. Dmc Aka Babloki & Kobra)
 Unikkatil - Djali Babes
 Unikkatil - Do (Feat. Presioni)
 Unikkatil - Dostat E Vërtetë
 Unikkatil - Fantazojn
 Unikkatil - Fisin legjendar
 Unikkatil - Fat Zi
 Unikkatil - Fjalt E Pavdekshme
 Unikkatil - Freestyle
 Unikkatil - Fryna
 Unikkatil - Gatshem Per Pasoja (Feat. Jeton)
 Unikkatil - Gatshem Per Pasoja (remix) (Feat. Jeton & Dredha)
 Unikkatil - Get Us
 Unikkatil - Get Us (english)
 Unikkatil - Hajde T'lagi (Feat. Vz, Buja & N.A.G)
 Unikkatil - Hey Yo Shqipe
 Unikkatil - Hip Hip 101 (remix) (Feat. Presioni & Orginallat)
 Unikkatil - If I Die, You Die
 Unikkatil - If U Aint Albanian, U Aint Ready For Dis Gangsta Shit
 Unikkatil - Intro
 Unikkatil - Intro T.B.A
 Unikkatil - Jaran (Feat. Hudra Aka Problemi)
 Unikkatil - Jepum Ideja
 Unikkatil - Jeta S'osht Film
 Unikkatil - Jeta Sosht Film (Remix) (Feat. Tee)
 Unikkatil - Ju Ha Per S'gjalli (Diss Princ Hysenit)
 Unikkatil - Justice
 Unikkatil - Kaj (Feat. Pristine)
 Unikkatil - Kanuni I Katilit
 Unikkatil - Katili
 Unikkatil - Kejt Hajvan
 Unikkatil - Kile Kile
 Unikkatil - Kosova
 Unikkatil - Krejt Zemer (Feat. Rameka & Pristine)
 Unikkatil - Ku T'meten Shokt (Feat. Jeton)
 Unikkatil - Kujdes (Feat. D.m.k & Klepto)
 Unikkatil - Kungajt (Feat. Klepto & Vz)
 Unikkatil - Kuq E Zi (Feat. Klepto)
 Unikkatil - Kur I Ki Met Kejt Tjeter Kah
 Unikkatil - Kur Qes Kanun (Feat. Klepto & N.A.G)
 Unikkatil - Kurgjo Gratis
 Unikkatil - Kush Po Don Fërrk
 Unikkatil - Lagjja Per Liri
 Unikkatil - Live By The Gun
 Unikkatil - Loja Jone
 Unikkatil - Ma T'fortit
 Unikkatil - Mbret En New York E Leje Me Prishtin (Feat. Benny Blanco)
 UniKKatil - Mentaliteti Jem (Feat. DMK & Rameka)
 Unikkatil - Mesazh
 Unikkatil - Mesazh Per Inat G
 Unikkatil - Mos Shaj Mas Shpine (Feat. Jeto)
 Unikkatil - Mos Shaj Mas Shpine (Remix)
 Unikkatil - Mos T'kisha Njoft
 Unikkatil - Mos T'vjen Inati (Feat. B52, N.A.G, Presioni, Klepto, Jeton, Cyanide, Milot & Benny Blanco)
 Unikkatil - Na Jena Belagji
 Unikkatil - Na Thej (Feat. Jeton , Special-K, Milot, Tee, N.A.G, Vz, B52 & Cyanide)
 Unikkatil - Nentori I Tret (Feat. Presioni)
 Unikkatil - Neper Cka Do
 Unikkatil - New Hit
 Unikkatil - Njerzt Harrojn
 Unikkatil - Nrrot Soms (version 2) (Feat. Pre$ioni & Jeton)
 Unikkatil - Nrrot T'soms
 Unikkatil - Old Intro
 Unikkatil - On Ur Kneez
 Unikkatil - Outro (Armiqt Suprem)
 Unikkatil - Pa Mshir (Mutat) (Feat. Nag & Dmk)
 Unikkatil - Pak Urti (Feat. Rameka Dredha)
 Unikkatil - Pengesa
 Unikkatil - Per Mangupa
 Unikkatil - Per Vllazni (Feat. N.A.G, Special-K & Jetoni)
 Unikkatil - Per Vllazni (remix) (Feat. Barooti & Floetri)
 Unikkatil - Për Vllaznit (Feat. Jeton, Cyanide, B52, N.A.G, Vz, Buja & Klepto)
 Unikkatil - Perballimi
 Unikkatil - Planet
 Unikkatil - Po Doni Fam
 Unikkatil - Porosia (Gjuj)
 Unikkatil - Prishtinali (remix) (Feat. Jeton & Presioni)
 Unikkatil - Prishtinalit Numer Njo (Feat. Presioni & Ye-Ton)
 Unikkatil - Pse Po Fryna
 Unikkatil - Pse Pom Shtin
 Unikkatil - Qa Tha
 Unikkatil - Qendro (Shpirt N'paqe)
 Unikkatil - Qeni Le Mas Miri
 Unikkatil - Qonu Kceni (Feat. Presioni)
 Unikkatil - Robt E Frikes
 Unikkatil - Robt E Frikes (remix)
 Unikkatil - Rrasja Box (remix) (Feat. Barooti & Buja)
 Unikkatil - Rrenat (Feat. Klepto & B52)
 Unikkatil - S'lujna Lojna (Feat. Jeton, Presioni & Klepto)
 Unikkatil - S'un Um Prek (Feat. Jeton & Tee)
 Unikkatil - Scary Night
 Unikkatil - Se S'kom Qare (Feat. Presioni & Benny Blanco)
 Unikkatil - Shan Reperat E Vjeter (Mesazh Per Reperat E Ri)
 Unikkatil - Shihemi n'Perkujtime
 Unikkatil - Shtigjet E Verteta
 Unikkatil - Shuj (Feat. Wnc)
 Unikkatil - Sjom Me Veten
 Unikkatil - Skit (kanuni I Katilit)
 Unikkatil - Skit 2 (Kanuni I Katilit)
 Unikkatil - Smun Ma Nxen Venin (Diss Double G Army)
 Unikkatil - Ta Zhdukim Policin
 Unikkatil - Tata Mata
 Unikkatil - Tata Mata (demo) (Feat. Cyanide)
 Unikkatil - Të Jesh Unikkatil
 Unikkatil - Tqoj Pesh
 Unikkatil- Ta zhdukim policin
 Unikkatil - Trim I Gjall
 Unikkatil - Tu U Kacafyt Me Jet
 Unikkatil - U Bo Jeta Monoton (Feat. Cyanide)
 Unikkatil - U Don't Get Me
 Unikkatil - U Qova Pi Vorri
 Unikkatil - Une E Di Kush Jom (Feat. Vz Tba)
 Unikkatil - Urdhno Knena
 Unikkatil - Urdhno Knena (remix)
 Unikkatil - Vdekjen E Sfidoj
 Unikkatil - Vdekjen E Sfidoj (remix)
 Unikkatil - Veq Edhe Ni Her (Feat. Cyanide)
 Unikkatil - Veq Fillimi (Feat. Cyanide & B52)
 Unikkatil - Vetbesim
 Unikkatil - Vllaznit E Ri
 Unikkatil-A pe sheh(Feat.Don Phenom)
 Unikkatil-Ni milion rrugë
 Unikkatil-Ça Jon ( Feat. Klepto)
 Unikkatil-Shqiptar(Feat.Mozzik)

References 

Living people
1981 births
Musicians from Pristina
Albanian rappers